The Roman Catholic  Diocese of Aguascalientes (erected 27 August 1899) is a suffragan diocese of the Archdiocese of Guadalajara.

Bishops

Ordinaries
José María de Jesús Portugal y Serratos, O.F.M. (1902 -1912) 
Ignacio Valdespino y Díaz (1913 -1928) 
José de Jesús López y Gonzalez (1929 -1950) 
Salvador Quezada Limón (1951 -1984) 
Rafael Muñoz Nuñez (1984 -1998) - Bishop Emeritus
Ramón Godinez Flores (1998 - 2007)
José María de la Torre Martín (2008 - 2020)
Juan Espinoza Jiménez (2022- )

Coadjutor bishop
Alfredo Torres Romero (1975-1976); did not succeed to see; appointed Bishop of Toluca, México in 1980

Auxiliary bishops
José de Jesús López y González (1927-1929), appointed Bishop here
Ricardo Guízar Díaz (1977-1984), appointed Bishop of Atlacomulco, México

Other priests of this diocese who became bishops
Juan María Navarrete y Guerrero, appointed Bishop of Sonora in 1919
Emilio Carlos Berlie Belaunzarán, appointed Bishop of Tijuana, Baja California Norte in 1983

Episcopal See
Aguascalientes, Aguascalientes

External links and references

Aguascalientes
Aguascalientes, Roman Catholic Diocese of
Aguascalientes
Aguascalientes